Amina Gennadyevna Atakhanova (born 3 May 2002) is a Russian retired pair skater. With former partner Ilia Spiridonov, she is the 2015–16 JGP Final bronze medalist.

Career

Early years 
Atakhanova started skating in 2005. She and Ilia Spiridonov began competing together in December 2014.

2015–2016 season 
Atakhanova/Spiridonov's international debut came in September 2015, at the 2015 Junior Grand Prix (JGP) competition in Linz, Austria. Ranked first in both segments, the pair won gold by a margin of 3.79 points over the Czech Republic's Anna Dušková / Martin Bidař. At their second JGP assignment, in Toruń, Poland, they were awarded the silver medal behind Ekaterina Borisova / Dmitry Sopot of Russia. These results qualified Atakhanova/Spiridonov for the 2015–16 JGP Final in Barcelona, Spain, where they won the bronze medal behind Borisova/Sopot and Dušková/Bidař.

At the 2016 Russian Junior Championships Atakhanova/Spiridonov won the silver medal behind Anastasia Mishina / Vladislav Mirzoev. They were selected to compete at the 2016 World Junior Championships, in Debrecen, Hungary, but withdrew before the start of the competition due to an injury to Atakhanova.

2016–2017 season 
During the 2016 JGP series, Atakhanova/Spiridonov won silver in the Czech Republic and placed fourth in Estonia. Finishing fourth in the JGP rankings, they qualified to the JGP Final in Marseille, France, where they would place sixth. Ranked 8th in the short and first in the free, they finished fourth overall at the 2017 World Junior Championships in Taipei, Taiwan. They received a small gold medal for their free skate.

Natalia Pavlova and Alexander Zaitsev coached Atakhanova/Spiridonov in Moscow. The skaters ended their partnership following the season.

Partnership with Volodin 
Atakhanova and Nikita Volodin teamed up in early 2018, coached by Alexei Sokolov in Saint Petersburg. In April 2018, they won gold at the Russian Youth Championships Elder Age.

Retirement 
On October 15, 2019, Atakhanova announced her retirement from competitive figure skating.

Records and achievements
 Set the junior-level pairs' record for the short program to 64.79 points at the 2016–17 ISU Junior Grand Prix competition in Tallinn, Estonia.

Programs

With Volodin

With Spiridonov

Competitive highlights 
JGP: Junior Grand Prix

With Volodin

With Spiridonov

Detailed results 

Small medals for short and free programs awarded only at ISU Championships.

With Spiridonov

References

External links 

 
 
 

2002 births
Russian female pair skaters
Living people
Figure skaters from Saint Petersburg